Reilly Neill is an American politician from Montana. A member of the Democratic Party, she served in the Montana House of Representatives for one term, from 2013 to 2015.

Neill defeated Dan Skattum in the 2012 elections, but lost in her re-election bid by Republican Debra Lamm in 2014. She was a candidate for governor of Montana in the 2020 Montana gubernatorial election.

Career 
Neill served as the interim executive director of the Park County Environmental Council in Livingston, Montana. Neill is currently the owner and publisher of the Livingston Current, a weekly newspaper that covers the arts, entertainment and culture of Park County, Montana.

Montana House of Representatives 
In 2012, Neill defeated Republican Dan Skattum for the state House District 62. While in office, she was a member of the Business and Labor Committee and Transportation Committee. She was particularly active in climate change issues, such as urging the Montana Department of Natural Resources and Conservation to consider climate change data when developing the state's new water plan and introducing legislation to study the effects of climate change on Montana's agricultural sector.

Post-congressional life 
Neill published a free monthly arts and culture publication, the Montana Press Monthly. In June 2019, Neill filed paperwork for a 2020 bid for the Montana Governor's seat. She ended her campaign in January 2020.

Political positions 
Neill, a Democrat, describes herself as a moderate Democrat and open-minded candidate that has political philosophies and interests that span traditional partisan lines.

Personal life 
Neill has a 10-year-old son, Caen Klipp

References

External links

Living people
Democratic Party members of the Montana House of Representatives
Women in Montana politics
Year of birth missing (living people)
Candidates in the 2020 United States elections
21st-century American women